Spiritual Unity is a 2005 album by guitarist Marc Ribot released on Pi Recordings. The album features compositions by saxophonist Albert Ayler who Ribot identifies as a significant influence. Bassist Henry Grimes who plays on the album had earlier recorded with Ayler. It was recorded at Orange Music Sound Studio, West Orange, New Jersey on October 28, 2004, except "Bells", which was recorded live at Tonic in New York City on October 27, 2004.

Reception
The Allmusic review by Sean Westergaard awarded the album 4 stars, stating, "Ayler's time on earth was far too short, but Ribot and company show that this music still lives on in the present moment, not simply as a relic of the past. Spiritual Unity isn't for the timid, but Ayler fans will find a lot to enjoy".

Track listing
All compositions are by Albert Ayler.
 "Invocation" – 9:17
 "Spirits" – 8:25
 "Truth Is Marching In" – 12:50
 "Saints" – 6:43
 "Bells" – 15:32

Personnel
Roy Campbell – trumpet, pocket trumpet
Marc Ribot – guitar
Henry Grimes – bass
Chad Taylor – drums

References

See also
Spiritual Unity

2005 albums
Marc Ribot albums
Pi Recordings albums